A dual narrative is a form of narrative that tells a story in two different perspectives, usually two different people. Dual narrative is also an effective technique that can be used to tell the story of people (or one person) at two different points in time (Postcards from No Man's Land, Great Expectations).
It is used to show parallels or emphasise differences in the lifestyles or points-of-view of different places or time periods.

References 

Literature